Good Luck, Mr. Yates is a 1943 American drama film directed by Ray Enright and written by Lou Breslow and Adele Comandini. The film stars Claire Trevor, Jess Barker, Edgar Buchanan, Tom Neal, Albert Bassermann and Henry Armetta. The film was released on June 29, 1943, by Columbia Pictures.

Plot

Cast          
Claire Trevor as Ruth Jones
Jess Barker as Oliver Yates
Edgar Buchanan as Jonesey Jones
Tom Neal as Charlie Edmonds
Albert Bassermann as Dr. Carl Hesser
Henry Armetta as Mike Zaloris
Scotty Beckett as Jimmy Dixon
Tommy Cook as Johnny Zaloris
Frank Sully as Joe Briggs
Douglas Leavitt as Monty King
Rosina Galli as Katy Zaloris
William Roy as Plunkett 
Conrad Binyon as Rob Coles
Bobby Larson as Ross
Rudy Wissler as Wilson

References

External links
 

1943 films
1940s English-language films
American drama films
Columbia Pictures films
Films directed by Ray Enright
American black-and-white films
1943 drama films
1940s American films